Painsra is a town of Faisalabad District located on Jhang road from Faisalabad. It is about 30 km from Bhawana City, 49 km from Jhang and 25 km from Faisalabad.

See also 
 Bhawana City
 Jhang District

References 

Cities and towns in Faisalabad District